Sychnovalva simillima is a species of moth of the family Tortricidae. It is found in Brazil in the states of Paraná, Santa Catarina and Minas Gerais.

The wingspan is about 18 mm. The ground colour of the forewings is cream with ochreous and brownish suffusions along the veins, brown costal spots and brown markings. The hindwings are brownish, but cream basally.

Etymology
The species name refers to its great similarity with Sychnovalva syrrhapta.

References

	

Moths described in 2010
Archipini